Matthew Rohrbach (born May 12, 1959) is an American politician who has served in the West Virginia House of Delegates from the 17th district since 2014.

References

1959 births
Living people
Republican Party members of the West Virginia House of Delegates
21st-century American politicians
Politicians from Huntington, West Virginia